Manhattan College is a private, Catholic, liberal arts university in the Bronx, New York City. Originally established in 1853 by the Brothers of the Christian Schools (De La Salle Christian Brothers) as an academy for day students, it was later incorporated as an institution of higher education through a charter granted by the New York State Board of Regents.

Manhattan College offers undergraduate programs in the arts, business, education, health, engineering, and science. Graduate programs are offered for education, business, science, and engineering.

History

Manhattan College was founded as the Academy of the Holy Infancy in 1853 by five French De La Salle Christian Brothers in a small building on Canal Street. When the need to expand forced them from Lower Manhattan, the college moved to 131st Street and Broadway, in the Manhattanville section of Harlem. The school's name was changed to Manhattan College when it received its state charter in 1863, and moved to its present location in the Riverdale section of the Bronx in 1922 as it outgrew its facilities in Manhattanville. This is often the cause of some confusion as the college is located outside of Manhattan but still within the city limits of New York City.

Originally exclusive to men, Manhattan College established a cooperative program with the College of Mount Saint Vincent after the pair became coeducational in 1973 and 1974, respectively. This partnership lasted until 2008. Since then, Manhattan College and the College of Mount Saint Vincent have been completely separate.

In 2018, Thomas O'Malley (Class of 1963) donated $25 million, the largest donation in the institution's history. The institution's business school has since been renamed the O'Malley School of Business.

Campus

Manhattan College occupies a relatively compact campus divided into a north and south campus in the residential Riverdale section of the Bronx. The North campus overlooks Van Cortlandt Park, and has as its focal point "the Quad", which sits at the center of the campus's four main buildings. Memorial Hall is the main entry onto campus and houses the office of the president as well as most of the other administrative offices on campus. Miguel Hall and De La Salle Hall are the main academic halls that border each side of the Quad. Miguel hosts the arts department and classes, while De La Salle is primarily used by the business school. The fourth side of the Quad is bordered by the chapel building, which houses Smith Auditorium (used to host receptions, speakers, and performances) on the first floor and the Chapel of De La Salle and His Brothers on the second floor, which features a painting of De La Salle and Brothers behind the altar, a large performing area where musical events and concerts take place on the altar, a grand piano, and a pipe organ in the balcony.

Thomas Hall, one of the institution's student life building, houses the offices of the Dean of Students, the student government, the musical ensembles, and others. Two of the institution's dining halls, Locke's Loft and Cafe 1853 are also located in Thomas Hall.

The brand new Kelly Commons, named after notable alumnus Raymond Kelly, is another student life building that was completed in 2014. It holds a Starbucks, a Marketplace, multiple different dining options, a state-of-the-art gym for student and faculty use, the Multicultural Center, halls for lectures and events, the student bookstore and the office for the student-run newspaper, The Quadrangle.

The O'Malley Library is a six-story structure that was joined with the previous library, the Cardinal Hayes Pavilion. Built on a hill, the new library was built directly next to and above the old one, essentially combining the two and creating more floors, while enhancing technology and adding group study spaces. The Office of Admissions is on the sixth floor of O'Malley.

Hayden Hall is on the east side of campus and houses the sciences as well as the department of fine arts. The Kakos Center for Scientific Computing may also be found here, which contains a cluster of high performance workstations used for a wide variety of scientific and economic projects.

On the South campus, across 240th street, is the Leo Engineering Building and the Research and Learning Center (RLC). The two are home to all of the engineering departments: electrical, computer, civil, chemical, mechanical, and environmental, along with the math and computer science departments and all communication classrooms, computer labs, and broadcasting studios. Laboratories and classes for these disciplines take place in both buildings. Both biology and chemistry laboratories are also located in Leo. This building once contained a working nuclear reactor, which was decommissioned and stripped of its nuclear fuel and power generating capabilities in 1999.

In September 2021, the Leo Engineering Building was refurbished with a new 30,000 square foot building with 14 engineering and science labs. The new laboratory building is named the Higgins Engineering & Science Center, thanks to a $5 million gift from Cornelius Higgins (Class of 1962) and his wife, Patricia.

There are currently four on-campus residence halls at Manhattan College. Jasper Hall and Chrysostom Hall are both traditional-style dorms, while Horan Hall and Lee Hall offer suite-style living. Overlook Manor is an off-campus residence hall that offers apartment style living.

Draddy Gymnasium is the home of the basketball and volleyball teams, and also features the largest indoor track in New York City. Gaelic Park, on 240th Street, has recently been renovated with an artificial turf and is where soccer, lacrosse, and softball teams play. The institution also utilizes adjacent Van Cortlandt Park for outdoor track and field, golf, and cross country as well as intramural activities. Alumni Hall is the home of the institution's workout facilities as well as the athletic administration.

The Broadway Garage is a five floor parking garage, approved in 2006 and completed soon afterward, located on Broadway. The garage offers parking to students and faculty, as well as visitors. The garage is also connected to Hayden hall via a pedestrian bridge that connects to one of Hayden's top floors, allowing pedestrians to bypass crossing Manhattan College Parkway.

Academics

Manhattan College offers degrees in six undergraduate schools: the School of Liberal Arts, the O'Malley School of Business, the School of Education and Health, the School of Engineering, the School of Science, and the School of Continuing and Professional Studies. The School for Liberal Arts is the largest school overall at the college, however the School of Engineering is the college's most well-known program. Manhattan currently hosts over 60 programs.

It's most popular undergraduate majors, based on 2021 graduates, were:
Civil Engineering (89)
Mechanical Engineering (73)
Finance (47)
Communication (44)
Finance (38)
 Psychology (37)

Students are required to take college-wide general education requirements (such as math, college writing, and religion) as well as core requirements in their respective school. For example, the School of Arts maintains a core curriculum called The Roots of Modern Learning which includes courses such as "Classical Origins of Western Culture."

Classes operate on a semester schedule. The first semester begins in late August and runs to December. The second semester begins in mid-January and runs to mid-May. Winter intersession and summer courses are also offered, but not required.

The institution offers a number of pre-professional programs such as pre-dental, pre-law, pre-medical, pre-physical therapy, and pre-veterinary; and graduate programs in mathematics, education, engineering and business. The graduate School of Engineering allows students studying engineering as an undergraduate the opportunity to continue on to get their master's degree without having to switch institutions, as is the case at colleges with a 3 + 2 engineering program. The B.S. Business / Masters of Business Administration Program offers students an option to complete a five-year multiple award program. The successful completion of the five-year program leads to two awards: a B.S. in business (in one of six majors) and an MBA.

Manhattan College contains chapters of various honor societies as Phi Beta Kappa, Sigma Xi and Tau Beta Pi, Pi Mu Epsilon, a national mathematics honor society. A newly established chapter of Lambda Pi Eta communication honorary has also been added, as well as Kappa Alpha Omicron an interdisciplinary environmental science and studies honorary. Manhattan participates in the Consortium of Liberal Arts Colleges and in the New York Cluster of seven colleges and universities supported by the Pew Charitable Trusts for undergraduate science education.

Rankings

In 2019, Money magazine ranked Manhattan as the top "transformative" school in the nation in a study that took into account earnings and graduation rates to determine which schools help students succeed professionally. Manhattan was ranked 78th out of 1,879 schools in return on investment according to PayScale's 2018 rankings. A 2015 Brookings Institution study ranked it as the ninth best school in the country when comparing expected versus actual mid-career earnings.

Athletics

Manhattan College fields 19 Division–I athletic teams for men and women, including basketball, golf, soccer, baseball and softball, lacrosse, volleyball, and rowing. The school's men's sports teams are called the Jaspers; women's teams are known as the Lady Jaspers. Historically track and field has been the school's strongest sport. Manhattan is a member of the Metro Atlantic Athletic Conference (MAAC).

In the modern era, basketball is the most popular sport at the institution. The current coach is Steve Masiello who has been with Manhattan since 2011 as head coach. During the 2013–2014 season, the Jaspers beat Iona in the MAAC Conference Final and went on to play the University of Louisville in the first round of the NCAA tournament in a controversial game where Masiello was set up to face his old mentor Rick Pitino. During the 2014–2015 season, the Jaspers again defeated Iona in the MAAC Conference Final to earn their second straight trip to the NCAA tournament, where they lost to Hampton University in the play-in game, or first round.

The Manhattan College Track and Field program is the richest athletic tradition at the institution, amassing a total of 31 out of a possible 32 MAAC Indoor/Outdoor Track titles. In 1973, Manhattan College won the Indoor NCAA Championship along with setting a new world record in the distance medley relay. Manhattan was also home to former American Record holder in the 5,000m Matthew Centrowitz Sr. The Program was run by legendary coach/runner Fred Dwyer who ran an astounding 4:00.8 mile while at his time at Villanova University. Manhattan still remains a power house on the east coast as one of the top programs around, under the direction of Dan Mecca.

The college annually played the New York Giants in the late 1880s and into the 1890s at the Polo Grounds and Manhattan is credited by the Baseball Hall of Fame with the practice of the "seventh inning stretch" spreading from there into major league baseball. It is written in the Baseball Hall of Fame that "During one particularly warm and humid day when Manhattan College was playing a semi-pro baseball team called the Metropolitans, Brother Jasper noticed the Manhattan students were becoming restless and edgy as Manhattan came to bat in the seventh inning of a close game. To relieve the tension, Brother Jasper called time-out and told the students to stand up and stretch for a few minutes until the game resumed."

Luis Castro, a Manhattan College alumnus, was the first Latin American-born player to play in Major League Baseball in the United States.

Manhattan College had a football program from 1924 until 1942. The team posted an all-time record of 194 wins, 198 losses and 22 ties. The final coach for the football team was Herbert M. Kopf. After the 1942 season, the school suspended intercollegiate football competition for World War II and then did not reactivate the program after completion of the war. The team was invited to the first ever Miami Palm Festival Game, predecessor to the Orange Bowl, played on January 2, 1933, University of Miami defeated Manhattan College, 7–0.  The team was revived in the 1965 in the form of a club team, and existed until 1987.

Manhattan College's rowing program holds much history, as well. It is one of the original 8 founding members of the Aberdeen Dad Vail Regatta, the largest collegiate regatta in the United States. The race attracts over one hundred colleges and universities from the U.S. and Canada and thousands of student-athletes on the second Saturday of May. The team's coach, Allen Walz, along with the football coach at the time, Herbert M. Kopf, served as stewards to the regatta. In 1936 and 1938, Manhattan was one of two teams competing in the regatta, the other being Rutgers, on the Harlem River. Both the men's and women's teams still compete in the Dad Vail Regatta today, as well as in the MAAC Championships, N.Y. State Championships, and Knecht Cup. The women's team became Division I in 2015, while the men's team has remained at the club level. The women's team currently trains out of Overpeck County Park under Head Coach Alex Canale while the men's team has moved to Glen Island Park under Head Coach Karla Ward. The women's rowing team won the Fall Metropolitan Championship (hosted by Iona College) in the fall of 2018 and the Spring Metropolitan Championship in the spring of 2019, making it the first time in program history that the Jaspers have won either of those titles.

Manhattan's men's lacrosse program became Division I in 1997. They have qualified for the MAAC tournament 7 times (2000, 2002, 2004, 2005 and 2008–2010). In 2002 the Jaspers went undefeated in the MAAC (9–0), and won the MAAC Championship. They finished with an 11–6 record. The Jaspers earned a bid to the NCAA Playoffs in 2002, playing Georgetown. They fell to Georgetown 12–7 in the first round of the NCAAs. They have produced many ALL-MAAC players throughout the 15 years of the program.

Performing arts

Manhattan College Pipes & Drums
Manhattan College Pipes & Drums was established in 1981 by Brother Kenneth Fitzgerald, FSC with the musical assistance of Captain Robert Hogan, of the New York City Police Department Emerald Society Pipes & Drums. The band's members are students, faculty, and alumni of the college.

The band marches in many local parades including the famed New York City Saint Patricks Day Parade.

Pep Band
Also known as the JasperBand, the Manhattan College Pep Band provides musical inspiration to get the Jasper crowds going at Men's and Women's basketball games. The Pep Band travels with teams to important away games to provide support away from home as well. In addition to performances at sporting events, the band also performs in concerts and events such as the MAAC Band Jam prior to the MAAC Basketball tournament. The band performs a variety of music from an expansive repertoire, ranging from Seven Nation Army by The White Stripes and You Can Call Me Al by Paul Simon, to modern day hits such as High Hopes by Panic! at the Disco and Mo Bamba by Sheck Wes. In 2016, New York City drummer Jake Robinson was appointed the director of the band. Under Robinson' direction, the band's size and repertoire continues to grow.

Performing arts ensembles

Manhattan College has eight recognized performing arts groups. In addition to the aforementioned Manhattan College Pipes & Drums and Pep Band, they have a Jazz Band, a choir called Singers, a theater club called Players, an improv troupe called Scatterbomb, an Orchestra and an a cappella group called Manhattones.

Transportation
The institution is located between two major New York City highways: the Henry Hudson Parkway and the Major Deegan Expressway. The Van Cortlandt Park–242nd Street station on the New York City Subway's  is located nearby, while the Riverdale station on the Metro-North Railroad's Hudson Line is located farther west.

Alumni

Manhattan has approximately 50,000 living alumni worldwide. Manhattan alumni are distinguishing themselves in the fields of academics, arts, engineering, literature, business, entertainment, government, and law.
 In the field of academia, Manhattan graduates include: Joseph A. Alutto, executive vice president and provost of the Ohio State University; L. Jay Oliva, 14th President of New York University; Henry Petroski, professor of civil engineering at Duke University.
 In arts and literature, Manhattan graduates include: William Edmund Barrett, author of The Left Hand of God and Lilies of the Field; James Patterson, Edgar Award-winning novelist; Al Sarrantonio, Bram Stoker Award-winning author; and George A. Sheehan, author of Running & Being: The Total Experience
 In the field of business, Manhattan graduates include Sam Belnavis, NASCAR owner; Vincent dePaul Draddy, football player who introduced Izod and Lacoste brands; John M. Fahey, president and CEO of the National Geographic Society; Frank M. Folsom, former president of RCA Victor; John Horan '40, former chairman & CEO of Merck & Co.; Lynn Martin, 68th president of the New York Stock Exchange; Eugene R. McGrath, former chairman and CEO of Con Edison; Eileen Murray, co-CEO of Bridgewater Associates;  Joseph M. Tucci, chairman, president and CEO of the EMC Corporation and Stephen J. Squeri, chairman and CEO of American Express. 
 In entertainment, Manhattan graduates include: Frank Campanella, TV and motion picture actor on Captain Video; Joseph Campanella, TV, stage, and motion picture actor on Mannix; Alexandra Chando, TV actress known for role as Maddie on As The World Turns; Dennis Day, TV and radio personality on The Jack Benny Program; Barnard Hughes, Emmy and Tony Award-winning actor on Hugh Leonard's Da; Mike Mazurki, professional wrestler and character actor; Hugo Montenegro, TV and movie soundtrack composer known for theme song for I Dream of Jeannie and The Outcasts; and Glenn Hughes, founding member of The Village People.
 In law and government, Manhattan graduates include: John S. Martin, former U.S. Attorney and U.S. District Judge for the Southern District of New York; Hugh J. Grant, 91st Mayor of New York City; Rudy Giuliani, 107th Mayor of New York City; Raymond W. Kelly, New York City Police Commissioner; Chang Myon, 2nd and 7th Prime Minister of South Korea;  and U.S Representatives from New York: Mike Lawler, John J. Boylan, John J. Delaney, John J. Fitzgerald, Ambassador Thomas E. McNamara, Bill Owens, Angelo D. Roncallo, Thomas Francis Smith, Andrew Lawrence Somers, and James J. Walsh.
 Other notable Manhattan graduates include: James W. Cooley, mathematician, co-author of the fast Fourier transform algorithm used in digital processing; Austin Dowling, archbishop of the Roman Catholic Archdiocese of Saint Paul and Minneapolis; Patrick Joseph Hayes, Cardinal Archbishop of New York; George Mundelein, Cardinal Archbishop of Chicago; Olympic track gold medalists Lindy Remigino, Lou Jones and Jordan Rand, model .

References

External links

 
 Manhattan College Athletics website

 

 
1853 establishments in New York (state)
Educational institutions established in 1853
Lasallian colleges and universities
Riverdale, Bronx
Universities and colleges in New York City
Universities and colleges in the Bronx
Catholic universities and colleges in New York (state)
Association of Catholic Colleges and Universities
Liberal arts colleges in New York (state)